Pârâul Mijlociu may refer to the following rivers in Romania:

 Pârâul Mijlociu (Geamărtălui), a tributary of the Geamărtălui in Dolj County
 Pârâul Mijlociu, a tributary of the Tih in Mureș County